The Chester Fritz Library is the largest library at the University of North Dakota (UND) in Grand Forks, North Dakota. It is the largest library in the state of North Dakota and houses over two million print and non-print items.  It is a designated U.S. Patent and Trademark depository of federal and state documents. The library also houses a Special Collections Department preserving unique publications, manuscripts, historical records, and genealogical resources, including a large collection of Norwegian bygdebøker (place histories).

The library is named after Chester Fritz (March 25, 1892 - July 28, 1983), a notable alumnus of UND, as is the Chester Fritz Auditorium, which is also located at UND.

References

External links 
Chester Fritz Library website
Chester Fritz Library Facebook page
Chester Fritz Library Twitter page

University and college academic libraries in the United States
Libraries in North Dakota
University of North Dakota
Federal depository libraries
Towers in North Dakota
Buildings and structures in Grand Forks, North Dakota